Canada ranks 37th by population, comprising about 0.5% of the world's total, with over 39 million Canadians as of 2022. Being, however, the fourth-largest country by land area (second-largest by total area), the vast majority of the country is sparsely inhabited, with most of its population south of the 55th parallel north and just over 60 percent of Canadians live in just two provinces: Ontario and Quebec. Though Canada's population density is low, many regions in the south, such as the Quebec City–Windsor Corridor, have population densities higher than several European countries. Canada's largest population centres are Toronto, Montreal, Vancouver, Calgary, Edmonton and Ottawa, with those six being the only ones with more than one million people.

The large size of Canada's north, which is not at present arable, and thus cannot support large human populations, significantly lowers the country's carrying capacity. In 2021, the population density of Canada was 4.2 people per square kilometre. As contrast, Russia's similar figure was 8.4 people per square kilometre.

The historical growth of Canada's population is complex and has been influenced in many different ways, such as indigenous populations, expansion of territory, and human migration. Being a new world country, immigration has been, and remains, the most important factor in Canada's population growth. The 2021 Canadian census counted a total population of 36,991,981, an increase of around 5.2 percent over the 2016 figure. Between 1990 and 2008, the population increased by 5.6 million, equivalent to 20.4 percent overall growth.

Historical population overview

Indigenous peoples

Scholars vary on the estimated size of the indigenous population in what is now Canada prior to colonization and on the effects of European contact. During the late 15th century is estimated to have been between 200,000 and two million, with a figure of 500,000 currently accepted by Canada's Royal Commission on Aboriginal Health. Although not without conflict, European Canadians' early interactions with First Nations and Inuit populations were relatively peaceful. However repeated outbreaks of European infectious diseases such as influenza, measles and smallpox (to which they had no natural immunity), combined with other effects of European contact, resulted in a twenty-five percent to eighty percent indigenous population decrease post-contact. Roland G Robertson suggests that during the late 1630s, smallpox killed over half of the Wyandot (Huron), who controlled most of the early North American fur trade in the area of New France. In 1871 there was an enumeration of the indigenous population within the limits of Canada at the time, showing a total of only 102,358 individuals. From 2006 to 2016, the Indigenous population has grown by 42.5 percent, four times the national rate. According to the 2011 Canadian Census, indigenous peoples (First Nations – 851,560, Inuit – 59,445 and Métis – 451,795) numbered at 1,400,685, or 4.3% of the country's total population.

New France
The European population grew slowly under French rule, thus remained relatively low as growth was largely achieved through natural births, rather than by immigration. Most of the French were farmers, and the rate of natural increase among the settlers themselves was very high. The women had about 30 per cent more children than comparable women who remained in France. Yves Landry says, "Canadians had an exceptional diet for their time." The 1666 census of New France was the first census conducted in North America. It was organized by Jean Talon, the first Intendant of New France, between 1665 and 1666. According to Talon's census there were 3,215 people in New France, comprising 538 separate families. The census showed a great difference in the number of men at 2,034 versus 1,181 women. By the early 1700s the New France settlers were well established along the Saint Lawrence River and Acadian Peninsula with a population around 15,000 to 16,000. Mainly due to natural increase and modest immigration from Northwest France (Brittany, Normandy, Île-de-France, Poitou-Charentes and Pays de la Loire) the population of New France increased to 55,000 according to the last French census of 1754. This was an increase from 42,701 in 1730.

British Canada

During the late 18th and early 19th century Canada under British rule experienced strong population growth. In the wake of the 1775 invasion of Canada by the newly formed Continental Army during the American Revolutionary War, approximately 60,000 of the 80,000 Americans loyal to the Crown, designated later as United Empire Loyalists fled to British North America, a large portion of whom migrated to Nova Scotia and New Brunswick (separated from Nova Scotia) in 1784. Although the exact numbers cannot be certain because of unregistered migration At least 20,000 went to Nova Scotia, 14,000 to New Brunswick; 1,500 to PEI and 6,000 to Ontario(13,000 including 5,000 blacks went to England and 5,500 to the Caribbean). For the rest of the 1780s additional immigrants arrived from the south. From 1791 An additional 30,000 Americans, called "Late Loyalists," were lured into Ontario in the 1790s by the promise of land and swearing loyalty to the Crown. As a result of the period known as the Great Migration by 1831, Lower Canada's population had reached approximately 553,000, with Upper Canada reaching about 237,000 individuals. The Great Famine of Ireland of the 1840s had significantly increased the pace of Irish immigration to Prince Edward Island and the Province of Canada, peaking in 1847 with 100,000 distressed individuals. By 1851, the population of the Maritime colonies also reached roughly 533,000 (277,000 in Nova Scotia, 194,000 in New Brunswick and 62,000 in Prince Edward Island). To the west British Columbia had about 55,000 individuals by 1851. Beginning in the late 1850s, the immigration of Chinese into the Colony of Vancouver Island and Colony of British Columbia peaked with the onset of the Fraser Canyon Gold Rush. By 1861, as a result of natural births and the Great Migration of Canada from the British Isles, the Province of Canada population increased to 3.1 million inhabitants. Newfoundland's population by 1861 reached approximately 125,000 individuals.

Post-confederation
The population has increased every year since the establishment of the Dominion of Canada in 1867; however, the population of Newfoundland was not included prior to its entry into confederation as Canada's tenth province in 1949. The first national census of the country was taken in 1871, with a population count around 3,689,000. The year with the least population growth (in real terms) was 1882–1883, when only 30,000 new individuals were enumerated.

The 1911 census was a detailed enumeration of the population showing a count of 7,206,643 individuals. This was an increase of 34% over the 1901 census of 5,371,315. The year with the most population growth was during the peak of the Post-World War II baby boom in 1956–1957, when the population grew by over 529,000, in a single twelve-month period. The Canadian baby boom, defined as the period from 1947 to 1966, saw more than 400,000 babies born annually. The 1996 census recorded a total population of 28,846,761. This was a 5.7% increase over the 1991 census of 27,296,859. The 2001 census had a total population count of 30,007,094. In contrast, the official Statistics Canada population estimate for 2001 was 31,021,300.

Canada's total population enumerated by the 2006 census was 31,612,897. This count was lower than the official 1 July 2006 population estimate of 32,623,490 people. Ninety percent of the population growth between 2001 and 2006 was concentrated in the main metropolitan areas. The 2011 census was the fifteenth decennial census with a total population count of 33,476,688 up 5.9% from 2006. On average, censuses have been taken every five years since 1905.  Censuses are required to be taken at least every ten years as mandated in section 8 of the Constitution Act, 1867.

Components of population growth
A population estimate for 2022 put the total number of people in Canada at 38,232,593.

Demographic statistics according to the World Population Review in 2022.

One birth every 1 minute
One death every 2 minutes
One net migrant every 2 minutes
Net gain of one person every 2 minutes

In 2010, Canada's annual population growth rate was 1.238%, or a daily increase of 1,137 individuals. Between 1867 and 2009 Canada's population grew by 979%. Canada had the highest net migration rate (0.61%) of all G-8 member countries between 1994 and 2004. Natural growth accounts for an annual increase of 137,626 persons, at a yearly rate of 0.413%. Between 2001 and 2006, there were 1,446,080 immigrants and 237,418 emigrants, resulting in a net migration of just over 1.2 million people. Since 2001, immigration has ranged between 221,352 and 262,236 immigrants per annum.

Population by years 
Prior to Canadian confederation in 1867 the population counts reflected only the former colonies and settlements and not the country to be as a whole with indigenous nations separated.

Ephemeral European settlements

Former colonies and territories

17th century

18th century

19th century

Canada as a whole since confederation

Census data by years

Data projections
In 2006, Statistics Canada projected for the decade 2021 to 2031 the population to grow by more than 5 million, or more than 10%. Between 1990 and 2008, the population increased by 5.6 million, equivalent to 20.4 percent overall growth. The 2016 Canadian census counted a total population of 35.1 million, or 1.5 million under the 2006 projection. 

In October 2020, the Trudeau government announced its plans to bring in more than 1.2 million immigrants over the subsequent three years, to catch up to the high-growth scenario.

Modern population distribution

By province and territory 

List of population centres in Alberta
List of population centres in British Columbia
List of population centres in Manitoba
List of population centres in New Brunswick
List of population centres in Newfoundland and Labrador
List of population centres in the Northwest Territories
List of population centres in Nova Scotia
List of population centres in Nunavut
List of population centres in Ontario
List of population centres in Prince Edward Island
List of population centres in Quebec
List of population centres in Saskatchewan
List of population centres in Yukon

By cities and municipalities

List of largest Canadian cities by census
List of the largest municipalities in Canada by population

First Nations
List of Indian reserves in Canada by population

See also

Demographics of Canada
Canada immigration statistics
Immigration to Canada
Interprovincial migration in Canada
List of Canadian provinces and territories by Human Development Index

References

Further reading

External links
Population of Canada - The Daily (Statistics Canada)
Canada's population clock - Statistics Canada
Canada Population  – Worldometers
Annual Estimates of Population for Canada, Provinces and Territories, from July 1, 1971 to July 1, 2014 - Economics and Statistics Branch (Newfoundland & Labrador Statistics Agency)
Population and Dwelling Count, 2011 Census –  Statistics Canada
Population estimates and projections, 2010 – 2036  –  Statistics Canada
Historical population and migration statistical data –   Statistics Canada (Archived)
Population Institute of Canada

Demographics of Canada